California State Park Peace Officers (S.P.P.O.) are fully sworn California State Police Officers, with two sub-classifications, the Ranger and the Lifeguard. S.P.P.O.s often use the title of State Police Officer during enforcement contact, as many Park Rangers and Lifeguards within municipalities, counties and special districts are armed Peace Officers, with authority throughout the state, on and off duty, like the California State Park Peace Officers law enforcement officer.  State Park Peace Officers perform a wide variety of general law-enforcement activities, including complex criminal investigations, traffic enforcement, and participate in statewide task forces, for gang suspension, narcotics enforcement, auto theft, and fish and wildlife crimes, under the jurisdiction of the California Department of Parks and Recreation in the state parks of California, United States. Duties include general law enforcement, aquatic rescue (by lifeguards and other certified officers), search and rescue, emergency medical response, interpretation of natural, historic and cultural resources, resource protection, park management and proactive enforcement patrol.  The current sidearm of the California State Park Peace Officer is the Smith & Wesson M&P, the current patrol rifle is the Colt AR-15 Model LE6920, and the current patrol shotgun is the Remington Model 870 Police Magnum.

Functions
Public safety
 Law-enforcement services
 Lifeguard services
 Medical aid/emergency medical response
 Operating and maintaining emergency equipment

Visitor assistance
 Advising visitors of rules and regulations
 Providing general park information

Public education and interpretation
 Community outreach
 Interpretive programs
 Junior Ranger and Lifeguard Program

Park Resource Protection and Management

Rank structure 
The California State Parks Peace Officers are broken up into two types of Law Enforcement officers. The Ranger and the Lifeguard.

Rangers

Lifeguard 

Both Lifeguards and Rangers work in conjunction to enforce state law and park regulations in the 279 parks under the jurisdiction of the State of California.

Training 
All State Parks Peace Officers must complete a Peace Officer Standards and Training (P.O.S.T.) academy before being sworn in as a Ranger or a Lifeguard. The CA Department of Parks and Recreation hosts a P.O.S.T. academy specifically for S.P.P.O.s at the Butte College.  The Ranger academy requires 6 to 8 months to complete, depending on the class. Each class typically consists of 40 cadets, both lifeguard and ranger.

Difference in Training at the Academy 
Since Rangers and lifeguards serve different purposes, their training differs slightly. Lifeguards receive all the training as Rangers, and are required to train in - and complete - swimming and nautical courses.

Training After the Academy 
S.P.P.O.s continue training regularly upon graduation from the academy and are encouraged to further their knowledge and skill base to best serve the parks and people of California. Some training includes EMT training, K-9 Handler training, counter-terrorism training, and firearms training.

See also 

 List of law enforcement agencies in California

References

External links
 California State Park Rangers Association
 California Park Ranger page
 Butte College Ranger Academy

State law enforcement agencies of California
Park police departments of the United States